The Central Intercollegiate Athletic Association (CIAA) is a college athletic conference affiliated with the National Collegiate Athletic Association (NCAA) at the Division II level. CIAA institutions mostly consist of historically black colleges and universities (HBCUs).

The twelve member institutions reside primarily along the central portion of the East Coast of the United States, in the states of Pennsylvania, Maryland, Virginia, North Carolina and South Carolina. Since a majority of the members are in North Carolina, the CIAA moved its headquarters to Charlotte, North Carolina from Hampton, Virginia in August 2015.

The CIAA sponsors 14 annual championships and divides into north and south divisions for some sports. The most notable CIAA sponsored championship is the CIAA Basketball Tournament having become one of the largest college basketball events in the nation.

History

The CIAA, founded on the campus of Hampton Institute (now Hampton University) in 1912, is the oldest African-American athletic conference in the United States. It was originally known as the Colored Intercollegiate Athletic Association and adopted its current name in December 1950. The conference composes predominantly of historically black colleges and universities (HBCUs) spanning the east coast from Pennsylvania to South Carolina.

Founding leaders were Allen Washington and Charles H. Williams of Hampton Institute; Ernest J. Marshall of Howard University; George Johnson of Lincoln University (PA); W. E. Atkins, Charles Frazier, and H. P. Hargrave of Shaw University; and J. W. Barco and J. W. Pierce of Virginia Union University.

Football experiences a major resurgence after going through a period of decline at several member universities. Football was absent from the campus of Saint Augustine's University for nearly three decades, before the administration reinstated it in 2002. Shaw University then brought back its football program in 2003, following a hiatus of 24 years.

Lincoln University, a charter member, added varsity football in 2008 and was readmitted to the CIAA after nearly three decades in Division III. Chowan University joined the CIAA in 2008 for football only. On October 14, 2008, the CIAA Board of Directors admitted Chowan as a full member effective July 1, 2009, the first non-HBCU to play in the conference.

On August 27, 2012, the CIAA announced the appointment of Jacqie Carpenter, the first African-American female commissioner to hold the position.

In 2014, a collection of records, including the original 1912 documents leading to the formation of the CIAA and meeting minutes from 1913 to 1922, were sold at auction after being discovered in a storage locker. The lot sold for $11,500 to an unnamed bidder.

On May 22, 2018, Chowan University announced its athletic department will realign with the Conference Carolinas as a full member while maintaining an associate relationship with the CIAA for both football and women's bowling.

Chronological timeline
 1912 – The CIAA was founded as the Colored Intercollegiate Athletic Association (CIAA). Charter member included Hampton Institute (now Hampton University), Howard University, Lincoln University (PA); Shaw University and Virginia Union University, effective beginning the 1912–13 academic year.
 1920 – Virginia State College (now Virginia State University) joined the CIAA, effective in the 1920–21 academic year.
 1921 – Virginia Theological Seminary and College (now the Virginia University of Lynchburg) joined the CIAA, effective in the 1921–22 academic year.
 1923 – Saint Paul's Normal and Industrial School (later Saint Paul's Polytechnic Institute and then Saint Paul's College) joined the CIAA, effective in the 1923–24 academic year.
 1924 – The Agricultural and Technical College of North Carolina (now North Carolina Agricultural & Technical State University) joined the CIAA, effective in the 1924–25 academic year.
 1926 – Johnson C. Smith University joined the CIAA, effective in the 1926–27 academic year.
 1928 – North Carolina College at Durham (now North Carolina Central University) joined the CIAA, effective in the 1928–29 academic year.
 1929 – Morgan College (now Morgan State University) joined the CIAA, effective in the 1929–30 academic year.
 1931 – Livingstone College joined the CIAA, effective in the 1931–32 academic year.
 1932 – Bluefield State Teachers College (now Bluefield State University) joined the CIAA, effective in the 1932–33 academic year.
 1933 – Saint Augustine's College (now Saint Augustine's University) joined the CIAA, effective in the 1933–34 academic year.
 1942 – West Virginia State College (now West Virginia State University) joined the CIAA, effective in the 1942–43 academic year.
 1945 – Delaware State College (now Delaware State University) and Winston-Salem Teachers College (now Winston-Salem State University) joined the CIAA, effective in the 1945–46 academic year.
 1950 – The CIAA has renamed as the Central Intercollegiate Athletic Association (CIAA), effective in the 1950–51 academic year.
 1954 – VUL left the CIAA, effective after the 1953–54 academic year.
 1954 – Fayetteville State Teachers College (now Fayetteville State University) and Maryland State College at Princess Anne (now the University of Maryland–Eastern Shore) joined the CIAA, effective in the 1954–55 academic year.
 1955 – Bluefield State and West Virginia State left the CIAA to join the West Virginia Intercollegiate Athletic Conference (WVIAC), effective after the 1954–55 academic year.
 1957 – Elizabeth City State Teachers College (now Elizabeth City State University) joined the CIAA, effective in the 1957–58 academic year.
 1960 – Lincoln (Pa.) left the CIAA, effective after the 1959–60 academic year.
 1962 – Norfolk Polytechnic College (now Norfolk State University) joined the CIAA, effective in the 1962–63 academic year.
 1970 – Delaware State, Howard, Maryland–Eastern Shore (UMES), Morgan State, North Carolina A&T and North Carolina Central left the CIAA to form the Mid-Eastern Athletic Conference (MEAC), effective after the 1969–70 academic year.
 1979 – Bowie State College (now Bowie State University) joined the CIAA, effective in the 1979–80 academic year.
 1980 – North Carolina Central re-joined back to the CIAA, effective in the 1980–81 academic year.
 1995 – Hampton left the CIAA to join the MEAC, effective after the 1994–95 academic year.
 1996 – Norfolk State left the CIAA to join the MEAC, effective after the 1995–96 academic year.
 2006 – Winston-Salem State left the CIAA to join the MEAC, effective after the 2005–06 academic year.
 2007 – North Carolina Central left the CIAA for a second time to re-join back to the MEAC, effective after the 2006–07 academic year.
 2008 – Lincoln (Pa.) re-joined back to the CIAA, effective in the 2008–09 academic year.
 2008 – Chowan University joined the CIAA as an associate member for football, effective in the 2008–09 academic year.
 2009 – Chowan upgraded to join the CIAA for all sports, effective in the 2009–10 academic year.
 2010 – Winston-Salem State re-joined back to the CIAA, effective in the 2010–11 academic year.
 2011 – Saint Paul's left the CIAA after the school announced that it was closing, effective after the 2010–11 academic year.
 2018 – Claflin University joined the CIAA, effective in the 2018–19 academic year.
 2019 – Chowan left the CIAA to join the Conference Carolinas (CC), effective after the 2018–19 academic year; while it remained in the conference as an associate member for football and women's bowling, effective in the 2019–20 academic year.
 2021 – Chowan left the CIAA as an associate member for women's bowling, effective after the 2021 spring season (2020–21 academic year).
 2022 – Chowan will leave the CIAA as an associate member for football, effective after the 2022 fall season (2022–23 academic year).
 2022 – Bluefield State will re-join back to the CIAA, effective beginning the 2023–24 academic year.

Member schools

Current members
The CIAA currently has 12 full members, one half are public schools and other half are private schools:

Notes

Future members
The CIAA will have one future full member, which is also a public school:

Notes

Associate members
The CIAA currently has one associate member, which is also a private school:

Notes

Former members
The CIAA had 13 former full members, all but 5 were public schools:

Notes

Former associate members
The CIAA had one former associate member, which was also a private school:

Notes

Membership timeline

Sports

Men's sponsored sports by school

Women's sponsored sports by school

‡ — D-I sport

Other sponsored sports by school

Conference facilities

CIAA Basketball Tournament

The CIAA is the first NCAA Division II conference to have its tournament televised as part of Championship Week on ESPN. Over 100,000 fans and spectators are in attendance annually and it has become one of the largest college basketball events in the nation. During the week of the tournament, there are many high-profile social and celebratory events associated with the event. The last day of the tournament is known as "Super Saturday" in which the men's and women's tournament champions are crowned.  For 15 years, the tournament had an annual $55 million economic impact on Charlotte, North Carolina and was consistently the largest event held in the city every year. The conference was offered better incentives to move it to Baltimore, Maryland in 2021, where it will remain at least through 2025.

CIAA cheerleading
One of the signature events of "Super Saturday" at the CIAA Basketball Tournament is the Cheer Exhibition.  At the exhibition, CIAA cheer squads showcase elaborate routines to entertain spectators and display their talents.  Every cheerleading team in the CIAA is a "Stomp-N-Shake" squad which is a unique style of cheer that is most common among historically Black colleges and schools located in the East Coast region.

The CIAA is one of the only conferences in the country that has an annual All-Conference Cheerleading Team.  The All-Conference Cheerleading Team is a recognition bestowed on select cheerleaders in the conference that exemplify the epitome of school spirit, leadership, athleticism, and academic excellence.

References

External links